Saket is a residential colony and the administrative headquarters of the South Delhi district of Delhi in India. The neighborhood is named after the city of Ayodhya, also known as Saket, an ancient, religiously significant city in Uttar Pradesh. Saket has four major malls on the Press Enclave Marg.

The road is named after the most recognizable enclave in Saket, Ibyat, where many journalists from media organizations around the country.

The local district headquarters are also situated on M.B. Road, Saket. DDA has developed the Saket Sports Complex spread over 18.5 acres, in 1990. Saket Colony was developed on the land of Abad Village.

Etymology
The name Saket (sāketa) in Sanskrit means a place that is close to the heavens. Saket was the ancient name of the city of Ayodhya.

Residential blocks 

Saket is primarily a residential area which consists of Press Enclave and residential blocks named by alphabets from A to N. These blocks constitute a mixture of row houses, multi-story apartments, and two-story apartments. There are several parks associated with these residential blocks as well.

Points of interest

Restaurants
There are three shopping areas in Saket: PVR Anupam complex, J-Block Market, and the Malls.
The PVR complex is ideal for branded eateries such as Pollo Tropical, McDonald's, Domino's, Subway, Cafe Coffee Day, Burger King, Barista as well several restaurants and pubs.

The J-Block market is relatively local but hosts an assortment of stores, including Gopala, which are popular sweet shops and a Bakery Rozana.

All the malls have food courts of their own and the area has recently been opened for independent commercial eateries. All major food chains are venturing into this region.

This time we bring to you the latest fad in town - Champa Gali.

Entertainment
Saket is home to the PVR Cinemas Anupam-4 Multiplex Theatre, which was the first multiplex in India. The place was originally called Anupam and was owned by the Ansals Group, a group that also ran the Gyan Bharti School and shared a common boundary with the Anupam complex. The Ansals Group eventually leased the cinema hall to the PVR Venture Group (Joint venture between Mr. Ajay Bijli and PVR of Australia). The nearby Select Citywalk mall also houses the PVR Premier, a newer 6-screen multiplex and the adjacent DLF Avenue house shops and restaurants like The Big Chill Cafe.

Around the area is an Archies gallery, and several other novelty shops. Also, close by at Saidul Ajaib, is the Garden of Five Senses developed by DTTDC.

Schools
There are several schools in and near Saket:
 
Apeejay School, Saket
Amity International School
Gyan Bharati School
Birla Vidya Niketan 
New Green Fields Public School
Red Roses Public School
Delhi Public School International is also known as DPS International
Amrita Vidyalayam
Vidya Niketan Senior Secondary School
Kendriya Vidyalaya, Pushp Vihar, New Delhi
Several government schools

Colleges

There are several colleges near Saket:

Shaheed Bhagat Singh College (Sheikh Sarai)
Sri Aurobindo College (Shivalik, Malviya Nagar)
Delhi Institute of Pharmaceutical Sciences and Research (Pushp Vihar)

Hotels
The Sheraton New Delhi - A five-star hotel owned by ITC-Welcomhotels, It has 220 rooms.
The Hosteller owns a backpacking hostel for travellers with 60 beds, divided between private rooms and dormitory setups. The hotel graced with lush milieu to repose oneself.

Another hotel is Hilton Garden Inn - New Delhi, located 30 minutes from Indira Gandhi International Airport, at DLF Place Saket District Centre.

Medical facilities
There are three hospitals in Saket, all of which are privately run: 
 Max Super Specialty Hospital (with 550 beds)
 Max smart super Speciality Hospital
 Pushpawati Singhania Hospital & Research Institute
 Sawan Neelu Angel's Nursing Home
 Chikitsa Hospital

Sports and culture

Saket Sports Complex
The Saket Sports Complex was developed by the DDA in 1990. It is spread over 18.5 acres in the area between Gyan Bharti School, Max Hospital, G.D. Modi Hospital and Mandir Marg. The sports complex offers various facilities for playing cricket, tennis, badminton, squash, and table tennis, and a gymnasium, a jogging track, and a swimming pool.

Shopping Centre

Saket is considered to be Delhi's one of the best locations for shopping with most magnificent Malls.

 Select Citywalk, Centre Saket
 DLF Avenue, Centre Saket
 Mgf Metropolitan Mall Saket
 Square One Mall Saket

Getting there and orientation

Saket shares its border with Mehrauli (where Qutub Minar, the largest brick minaret in the world, is situated) on the west, Pushp Vihar on the east, Malviya Nagar & Gitanjali Enclave on the North and Sainik Farms on the south side.

Saket lies on the Yellow Line of Delhi Metro. There are 2 metro stations in Saket, Malviya Nagar station on the Press Enclave Road and Saket station on Mehrauli-Badarpur Road. Both these stations are underground. Saket is the last underground station on the yellow line from Huda City Center towards Rajiv Chowk.

One can also reach Saket on any of the following buses: 427, 493, 500, 501, 512, 522A, 532, 534, 448, 448A, 548, 680 at the Bahri Mudrika (Outer Ring Road). There are many auto rickshaw and taxi stands here as well.

References 

Neighbourhoods in Delhi
South Delhi district
District subdivisions of Delhi